Susan Gerard (born June 13, 1950) is a former member of both the Arizona State Senate and the Arizona House of Representatives. She served in the House from January 1989 until January 2001, and in the Senate from January 2001 through January 2003. She was first elected to the House in November 1988, representing District 18, and was re-elected five times, in 1990, 1992, 1994, 1996, and 1998. In 2000 she ran for the State Senate seat in the same district and won. After redistricting in 2002, she ran for re-election in District 11, but lost in the Republican primary to Barbara Leff.

References

1950 births
Republican Party Arizona state senators
Republican Party members of the Arizona House of Representatives
Living people
People from Englewood, New Jersey
Women state legislators in Arizona
20th-century American politicians
20th-century American women politicians
21st-century American politicians
21st-century American women politicians